April Genevieve Tucholke is an American author based in Georgia. She is best known for the Gothic horror novel Between the Devil and the Deep Blue Sea and its sequel Between the Spark and the Burn, as well as a dark young adult mystery novel Wink Poppy Midnight, all published by Penguin Books.

Biography
Tucholke grew up on a farm in the Midwest and has since lived in a variety of places, including Colorado, North Carolina, Massachusetts, Oregon and Scotland. She currently lives in Savannah, Georgia.

Career 
Tucholke was initially represented by Joanna Volpe of New Leaf Literary, who offered representation within 24 hours of receiving the manuscript for Between the Devil and the Deep Blue Sea. The book sold to Penguin's imprint Dial, who purchased the book in a preemptive deal. 

Tucholke edited the anthology Slasher Girls & Monster Boys (Penguin, 2015), and her third novel Wink Poppy Midnight was published by Penguin Books in 2016. She contributed to Because You Love to Hate Me, an anthology of short stories written by 13 YA authors who were paired with 13 BookTubers published in July 2017.

The Boneless Mercies, a gender-bent retelling of Beowulf, was published by Farrar, Straus, and Giroux in October, 2018. A companion novel, The Seven Endless Forests, a gender-bent retelling of the King Arthur legend with a Norse twist, was published in 2020.

Tucholke's first picture book, Beatrice Likes the Dark was published in September, 2022 from Algonquin, an imprint of Workman Publishing Company with illustrations by Khoa Lee.  A second picture book, Merry and Hark: A Christmas Story with illustrations by Rebecca Santo is anticipated in 2023 also from Algonquin.

Tucholke is now represented by Eric Myers of Myers Literary Management.

Works

Between the Devil and the Deep Blue Sea duology 
Between the Devil and the Deep Blue Sea (2013)
Between the Spark and the Burn (2014)

Standalone 
Wink Poppy Midnight (2016)

Fantasies 
The Boneless Mercies (2018)
The Seven Endless Forests (2020)

Picture Books 
Beatrice Likes the Dark (2022)
Merry and Hark: A Christmas Story (2023)

Adult Nonfiction 
Clandestine (forthcoming from Workman Publishing Company, 2023), in collaboration with Stefan Bachmann

Anthologies 
 Slasher Girls & Monster Boys (Editor and Contributing Writer) (2015)
 Because You Love to Hate Me: 13 Tales of Villainy (Contributing Writer) (2017)

Book awards

Between the Devil and the Deep Blue Sea
 2014 YALSA Teens Top Ten award selection
 2014 Kentucky Blue Grass Award nominee
 2014 Westchester Fiction Award, Honorable Mention

Wink Poppy Midnight
YALSA Best Fiction for Young Adults
YALSA Top Ten Amazing Audiobooks for Young Adults
A Junior Library Guild Selection
Spring 2016 Kids’ Indie Next List
Amazon Editors' Best Books of the month, March 2016
Teen Vogue’s Best New YA Books of 2016
PureWow's Best of Spring
Popcrush's 10 best Young Adult Books of 2016
Mashable's best young adult books of 2016

The Boneless Mercies
2018 Publishers Weekly Best Book of 2018
Green Mountain Book Award for 2019-2020

References

External links
 

Living people
21st-century American novelists
American women novelists
21st-century American women writers
American young adult novelists
Women writers of young adult literature
American children's writers
Writers from Savannah, Georgia
People from Savannah, Georgia
Novelists from Georgia (U.S. state)
Year of birth missing (living people)